T9 is a predictive text technology for mobile phones (specifically those that contain a 3×4 numeric keypad), originally developed by Tegic Communications, now part of Nuance Communications. T9 stands for Text on 9 keys.

T9 was used on phones from Verizon, NEC, Nokia, Samsung Electronics, Siemens, Sony Mobile, Sanyo, SAGEM and others, as well as PDAs such as Avigo during the late 1990s. The main competing technologies include iTap created by Motorola, SureType created by RIM, Eatoni's LetterWise and WordWise, and Intelab's Tauto. 

T9 is not available on Apple devices but is available on certain inexpensive phones without a touchscreen, and modern Android phones where it can be used to dial contacts by spelling the name of the contact one is trying to call.

The technology was protected by multiple US patents, but they have since expired.

Design 

T9's objective is to make it easier to enter text messages. It allows words to be formed by a single keypress for each letter, which is an enormous improvement over the multi-tap approach used in conventional mobile phone text entry at the time, in which several letters are associated with each key, and selecting one letter often requires multiple keypresses.

T9 combines the groups of letters on each phone key with a fast-access dictionary of words. It will then look up in the dictionary all words corresponding to the sequence of keypresses and order them by frequency of use. As T9 "gains familiarity" with the words and phrases the user commonly uses, it speeds up the process by offering the most frequently used words first and then letting the user access other choices with one or more presses of a predefined "Next" key.

The dictionary is expandable. After introducing a new word, the next time the user tries to produce that word, T9 adds it to the predictive dictionary. The user database (UDB) can be expanded via multi-tap. The implementation of the user database is dependent on the version of T9 and how T9 is actually integrated on the device. Some phone manufacturers supply a permanent user database, while others do so for the duration of the session.

Features 
Some T9 implementations feature smart punctuation. This feature allows the user to insert sentence and word punctuation using the '1'-key. Depending on the context, smart punctuation inserts sentence punctuation (period or 'full stop') or embedded punctuation (period or hyphen) or word punctuation (apostrophe in can't, won't, isn't, and the possessive  's). Depending on the language, T9 also supports word breaking after punctuation to support clitics such as l'  and n' in French and  's in English.

The UDB is an optional feature that allows words that were explicitly entered by the user to be stored for future reference. The number of words stored depend on the implementation and the language.

In later versions of T9, the order of the words presented is adapted to the usage pattern. For instance, in English, 4663 matches "good", "home", "gone", "hood", etc. Such combinations are known as textonyms; e.g., "home" is referred to as a textonym of "good". T9 is encoded to prefer the word that its programmers determined to be the most common "textonym", such as "good" over "home" or "gone", "hand" over "game", or "bad" over "cad" or "ace".

When the user tends to use "home" more often than "good", eventually the two words switch position, and "home" is presented as the default option instead. Information about common word combinations can also be learned and stored for future predictions (so, "I'm feeling" followed by 4663 will be offered as "good" instead of "home", whereas "I went back" and 4663 would be "home", not "good").

For words entered by the user, word completion can be enabled. When the user enters matching keypresses, in addition to words and stems, the system also provides completions.

In later versions of T9, the user can select a primary and secondary language and access matches from both languages. This enables users to write messages in their native language, as well as a foreign one.

Some implementations learn commonly used word pairs and provide word prediction (e.g. if one often writes "eat food", after entering "eat" the phone will suggest "food", which can be confirmed by pressing Next).

T9 can automatically recognize and correct typing/texting errors, by looking at neighboring keys on the keypad to determine an incorrect keypress. For example, the word "testing" is entered with the key combination "8378464". Entering the same number but with two incorrect keypresses of neighboring keys, e.g., "8278494" results in T9 suggesting the words "tasting" (8278464), "testing" (8378464), and "tapping" (8277464).

Algorithm 
In order to achieve compression ratios of close to 1 byte per word, T9 uses an optimized algorithm that maintains word order and partial words (also known as stems); however, because of this compression, it over-generates words that are sometimes visible as "junk words". This is a side effect of the requirements for small database sizes on the lower end embedded devices.

Examples 
On a phone with a numeric keypad, each time a key (1-9) is pressed (when in a text field), the algorithm returns a guess for what letters are most likely for the keys pressed to that point. For example, to enter the word 'the', the user would press 8 then 4 then 3, and the display would display 't' then 'th' then 'the'. If the less-common word 'fore' is intended (3673) the predictive algorithm may select 'Ford'. Pressing the 'next' key (typically the '*' key) might bring up 'dose', and finally 'fore'. If 'fore' is selected, then the next time the user presses the sequence 3673, fore will be more likely to be the first word displayed. If the word "Felix" is intended, however, when entering 33549, the display shows 'E', then 'De', 'Del', 'Deli', and 'Felix.' This is an example of a letter changing while entering words.

Successors 

Many smart keyboards now exist, such as Swype or Swiftkey, that have taken the idea of T9 and married it with the advanced touchscreen technology found in Android phones and iPhones. These advances have made T9 obsolete in newer cellphones for many users, since it is predicated on the use of a keypad with nothing besides numbers, the asterisk and the pound key (known as the hash key in Commonwealth countries). Many features, such as predictive text, have been adopted by and improved by future generations of keyboard software. However, T9 remains viable. For example, those with larger fingertips still use the T9 based keyboard on smartphones for text entry, because key press accuracy increases with the larger screen area per key on a numeric-style 4×3 keyboard. Such T9 formats for text entry therefore remain available in all latest [as of August 2020] iterations of LG keyboards, certain Samsung keyboards, and third party T9 keyboards such as Go keyboard for Androids and Type Nine for iPhones, as shown on this LG V60.

See also 
 XT9
 LetterWise
 Predictive text
 Telephone keypad
 Phoneword

References

External links 
Nuance T9 Customer facing site

Natural language processing
User interface techniques
Nuance software
Input methods for handheld devices